The following is a list of former Ministers of Justice of Turkey.

Legend:
 AKP: Justice and Development Party
 ANAP: Motherland Party
 AP: Justice Party
 CHP: Republican People's Party
 CKMP: Republican Villagers Nation Party
 DP: Democrat Party
 DSP: Democratic Left Party
 DYP: True Path Party
 IP: Independent politician
 M: Military after coup d'état
 NP: Non-parisan (Civil servant)
 RP: Welfare Party
 SHP: Social Democratic Populist Party

References

Justice
Turkey